The Wicker Park District is a historic district in the West Town community area of Chicago, Illinois.  It is the neighborhood bounded by Bell Avenue, Caton Street, Leavitt Street, Potomac Avenue and Chicago 'L' tracks.  It was designated a Chicago Landmark on April 12, 1991.

The district may overlap with the Wicker Park Historic District, which was listed on the National Register of Historic Places in 1979.

Notes

External links
Official City of Chicago West Town Community Map
http://www.wickerpark.com
Chicago Encyclopedia Page

Chicago Landmarks
Historic districts in Chicago